Ezziona is a genus of soft corals in the family Xeniidae. It is monotypic with a single species, Ezziona dinesenae.

References

Xeniidae
Octocorallia genera